Phaenochilus is a genus of lady beetles in the family Coccinellidae. There are about 10 described species in Phaenochilus. It is found in Southeast Asia, India, and Japan.

Species
These 10 species belong to the genus Phaenochilus:
 Phaenochilus albomarginalis Li & Wang, 2017
 Phaenochilus flaviceps Miyatake 1970
 Phaenochilus indicus Miyatake 1970
 Phaenochilus kashaya Giorgi & Vandenberg, 2012
 Phaenochilus metasternalis Miyatake 1970
 Phaenochilus mikado Lewis 1896
 Phaenochilus monostigma Weise 1895
 Phaenochilus punctifrons Weise 1895
 Phaenochilus renipunctus Chapin 1965
 Phaenochilus ruficollis Weise 1885

References

Further reading

 
 
 

Coccinellidae
Coccinellidae genera